The 2012–13 Liga Premier de Ascenso season was split in two tournaments Apertura and Clausura. Liga Premier was the third-tier football league of Mexico. The season was played between 11 August 2012 and 1 June 2013.

Teams 
32 teams participated in this tournament.

Changes from previous season
 Reynosa F.C., Indios UACJ, Delfines del Carmen and Promesas Altamira new expansion teams.
 Atlas "B" was promoted from Liga de Nuevos Talentos.
 Real Cuautitlán was promoted from Tercera División.
 Tecamachalco F.C. didn't play this season because the team was being restructured to be promoted to Ascenso MX.
 Tulancingo played in Liga de Nuevos Talentos.
 Lozaro, Guerreros Acapulco and San Miguel Caudillos dissolved.
 Deportivo Guamúchil adopted their unofficial name as official and was renamed as Murciélagos F.C.

Group 1

Group 2 
{{Location map+ |Mexico |width=700|float=right |caption=Location of teams in the 2012–13 LPA Group 2 |places=

Torneo Apertura

Regular season

Group 1

Standings

Results

Group 2

Standings

Results

Regular Season statistics

Top goalscorers 
Players sorted first by goals scored, then by last name.

Liguilla 
The eight best teams of each group play two games against each other on a home-and-away basis. The higher seeded teams play on their home field during the second leg. The winner of each match up is determined by aggregate score. In the Round of 8, quarterfinals and semifinals, if the two teams are tied on aggregate the higher seeded team advances. In the final, if the two teams are tied after both legs, the match goes to extra time and, if necessary, a penalty shoot-out.

Round of 8

First leg

Second leg

Quarter-finals

First leg

Second leg

Semi-finals

First leg

Second leg

Final

First leg

Second leg

Torneo Clausura

Regular season

Group 1

Standings

Results

Group 2

Standings

Results

Regular Season statistics

Top goalscorers 
Players sorted first by goals scored, then by last name.

Liguilla 
The eight best teams of each group play two games against each other on a home-and-away basis. The higher seeded teams play on their home field during the second leg. The winner of each match up is determined by aggregate score. In the Round of 8, quarterfinals and semifinals, if the two teams are tied on aggregate the higher seeded team advances. In the final, if the two teams are tied after both legs, the match goes to extra time and, if necessary, a penalty shoot-out.

Round of 8

First leg

Second leg

Quarter-finals

First leg

Second leg

Semi-finals

First leg

Second leg

Final

First leg

Second leg

Relegation Table 

Last updated: 27 April 2013 Source: Liga Premier FMFP = Position; G = Games played; Pts = Points; Pts/G = Ratio of points to games played

Promotion Final 
The Promotion Final is a series of matches played by the champions of the tournaments Apertura and Clausura, the game is played to determine the winning team of the promotion to Ascenso MX. 
The first leg was played on 29 May 2013, and the second leg was played on 1 June 2013.

First leg

Second leg

See also 
2012–13 Liga MX season
2012–13 Ascenso MX season
2012–13 Liga de Nuevos Talentos season

References

External links 
 Official website of Liga Premier
 Magazine page 

 
1